Nefasit, also known as Tappa Nefasit, is a small town in the Northern Red Sea Region of Eritrea. Monastery of Debre Bizen is located at the mountains above.

According to multiple tour groups the stretch between the capital Asmara and Nefasit is the most beautiful in Eritrea. There's a colonial era Italian railway that occasionally runs from Asmara.

Climate

References 
Tappa Nefasit

Populated places in Eritrea
Northern Red Sea Region